Arvo Vallikivi (born 14 December 1935 in Märjamaa), commonly known under the pen name of Arvo Valton, is an Estonian writer known for a number of books and, among other things, the script for Viimne reliikvia, the highly successful movie adaptation of Eduard Bornhöhe's Vürst Gabriel ehk Pirita kloostri viimsed päevad.

In October 1980, Valton was a signatory of the Letter of 40 Intellectuals, a public letter in which forty prominent Estonian intellectuals defended the Estonian language and protested the Russification policies of the Kremlin in Estonia.  The signatories also expressed their unease against Republic-level government in harshly dealing with youth protests in Tallinn that were sparked a week earlier due to the banning of a public performance of the punk rock band Propeller.

In 1992, Arvo Valton was elected member of parliament (Riigikogu).

Bibliography 
 Veider soov (1963)
 Rataste vahel (1965)
 Kaheksa jaapanlannat (1968)
 Luikede soo. Karussel (1968)
 Sõnumitooja (1972)
 Õukondlik mäng (1972)
 Pööriöö külaskäik (1974)
 Läbi unemaastike (1975)
 Tee lõpmatuse teise otsa (1978)
 Mustamäe armastus (1978)
 Ajaprintsess (1981)
 Võõras linnas (1981)
 Zugluft (1983)
 Arvid Silberi maailmareis (Arvid Silber's Trip Round the World, 1984)
 Üksildased ajas (1983 and 1985)
 Masendus ja lootus (1989)
 Õndsusse kulgev päev (1992)
 Kogutud teosed (Collected works, 1998)

References

External links 
 Arvo Valton's entry at the Estonian Literature Information Centre

1935 births
Living people
People from Märjamaa
Pro Patria Union politicians
Isamaa politicians
Members of the Riigikogu, 1992–1995
Estonian screenwriters
Tallinn University of Technology alumni
Recipients of the Order of the National Coat of Arms, 3rd Class
Recipients of the Order of the White Star, 3rd Class
20th-century Estonian politicians
21st-century Estonian politicians